The Participatory Culture Foundation (PCF) is a 501(c)(3) non-profit organization whose mission is to "enable and support independent, non-corporate creativity and political engagement."

Its primary project is a free and open-source software Internet television platform called Miro, formerly named Democracy Player.

History 
It was founded in February 2005 and is based in Worcester, Massachusetts. The Downhill Battle project precedes PCF.

PCF has received financial support from the Rappaport Family Foundation, Mitch Kapor's Open Source Applications Foundation, the Surdna Foundation, Knight Foundation, and other private donors.

On May 29, 2007, the Mozilla Foundation announced that it had awarded PCF a grant to continue their work on its open-source video projects.

Projects 
 Miro – a free/open-source broadcatching software application which allows subscribing to web feeds of downloadable audio and video
 Miro Guide – a web-based directory of audio and video web feeds, integrated by default into the application
 Miro Community – a free web hosting service for user-submitted video; hosts mostly Theora-formatted video in HTML5-compatible web browsers
 Amara (formerly Universal Subtitles) – crowd-source translations
 The Channel Channel – a project to provide one-minute previews of internet channels; last updated in January 2007
 Video Bomb – a folksonomy-driven video directory
 Broadcast Machine – a desktop application allowing easy publishing of video files and updated internet television channels; last updated February 21, 2006
 Miro Video Converter – an application to convert any video to MP4, Theora or formats compatible with Android, iPod, iOS (iPhone, iPod Touch, iPad), and PlayStation Portable devices

See also 
 Participatory culture
 Public participation

References

External links 
 
 PCF at National Center for Charitable Statistics

Charities based in Massachusetts
Organizations established in 2005
Organizations based in Worcester, Massachusetts
Free and open-source software organizations
2005 establishments in Massachusetts
Participatory democracy